Panajot Qirko (born 26 June 1999), commonly known as Pano Qirko, is an Albanian professional footballer who plays as a goalkeeper for Albanian club Teuta Durrës.

Club career

Early career
Qirko started his youth career at KF Vlora in 2012. A year later he moved to fellow Vlora club Flamurtari Vlorë. He won the 2014–15 Superliga under-17 with Flamurtari U-17. In the 2015–16 season he played 3 youth cup games with under-17 side. Then he moved to the under-19 and so far for the 2016–17 season he has played 10 youth league games.

Flamurtari
For the 2016–17 he gained entry with the first team of Flamurtari Vlorë and was placed as a third choice behind Argjent Halili and Stivi Frashëri leaving behind Edmir Sali. He made it his professional debut on 16 November 2016 in the 2016–17 Albanian Cup match against Tërbuni Pukë coming on as a substitute in the 73rd minute in place of Frashëri in a 2–0 win.

International career

Albania U16
He participated with Albania national under-16 football team in the UEFA Development Tournament 2015 and played 2 matches under coach Alban Bushi, against Montenegro U16 on 2 May 2015 in a 3–1 win and kept a clean sheet a day later against Armenia U16. Following a 1–0 victory against Cyprus U16 2 days later, Albania U16 won the tournament.

Albania U17
Qirko was called up to Albania national under-17 football team by coach Džemal Mustedanagić for a friendly tournament in Italy against Fasano, Frosinone & Italy B on match-dates 19–21 May 2015.

Albania U19
He was then called up at Albania national under-19 football team in the pre-eliminary squad by coach Arjan Bellaj to participate in the 2017 UEFA European Under-19 Championship qualification from 6–11 October 2016.

Qirko was re-called to under-19 team by new coach Erjon Bogdani for a gathering in Durrës, Albania in April 2017 where they also played two friendly matches. He was called up also for the next gathering for a double Friendly match against Georgia U19 on 30 August & 1 September 2017.

Career statistics

Club

Honours

Club 
Tirana
 Albanian Superliga: 2019–20

Teuta
Albanian Supercup: 2021

International 
Albania U16
UEFA Development Tournament: 2015

References

External links

Pano Qirko profile FSHF.org

1999 births
Living people
Footballers from Vlorë
Albanian footballers
Association football goalkeepers
Albania youth international footballers
Flamurtari Vlorë players
KF Tirana players
Kategoria Superiore players